This is a list of electoral results for the electoral district of Borung in Victorian state elections.

Members for Borung

First incarnation (1889–1927)

Second incarnation (1945–1955)

Election results

Elections in the 1950s

Elections in the 1940s

Elections in the 1920s

Elections in the 1910s

References

Victoria (Australia) state electoral results by district